After the demise Chief Minister C. N. Annadurai the Council of Ministers headed by him was dissolved and the Governor appointed V. R. Nedunchezhiyan the Senior most member of the Council of Ministers to act as the Chief Minister till the election of a new leader by the party. He resigned after M. Karunanidhi was elected as party leader, hence the ministry was dissolved.

Cabinet ministers

References 

Dravida Munnetra Kazhagam
Tamil Nadu ministries
1960s in Tamil Nadu
1969 establishments in Tamil Nadu
Cabinets established in 1969